The Des Moines Roosters is a United States Australian Football League team, based in Des Moines, United States. It was founded in 2010. They play in the USAFL.

See also

References

External links
 

Australian rules football clubs in the United States
Sports in Des Moines, Iowa
Australian rules football clubs established in 2010
2010 establishments in Iowa